Brian Williams (born 1959) is an American journalist.

Brian Williams may also refer to:

People

Sports

American football
Brian Williams (center) (born 1966), American football center
Brian Williams (linebacker) (born 1972), American football linebacker
Brian Williams (cornerback) (born 1979), American football cornerback

Other sports
Brian Williams (Australian footballer) (1936–2010), Australian rules footballer
Brian Williams (sportscaster) (born 1946), Canadian sportscaster
Brian Williams (footballer, born 1955), English footballer
Brian Williams (footballer, born 1961), Trinidadian football coach and football player
Brian Williams (rugby union) (1962–2007), Welsh rugby player
Brian Williams (basketball) or Bison Dele (1969–2002), American basketball player
Brian Williams (baseball) (born 1969), American baseball pitcher

Other people
Brian Williams (director), Irish-born London-based designer turned creative advertising director
Brian Williams (illustrator) (1956–2010), illustrator of the later Lone Wolf gamebooks
Brian Williams (Missouri politician), member of the Missouri Senate
Brian Williams (Ohio politician) (born 1942), former member of the US state of Ohio's House of Representatives
Brian Williams (surgeon) (born 1969), American surgeon
Lustmord (Brian Williams), experimental musician
Brian Glyn Williams, professor of Islamic history

Fictional characters
Brian Williams, father of fictional character Rory Williams in the television series Doctor Who
Smash Williams (Brian Williams), a fictional character in the television series Friday Night Lights

See also
Bryan Williams (disambiguation)